Coed Llandyfan is a Site of Special Scientific Interest in Carmarthen & Dinefwr,  Wales.

See also
List of Sites of Special Scientific Interest in Carmarthen & Dinefwr

References

External links
 Map showing the outline of the SSSI

Sites of Special Scientific Interest in Carmarthen & Dinefwr